Huchuquan was the last chanyu of the Southern Xiongnu during the late Eastern Han dynasty and Three Kingdoms period of China. He was a younger brother of the Xiongnu chanyu in exile, Yufuluo.

History 
After his brother died in 195, Huchuquan attempted to regain his position as Chanyu of the Southern Xiongnu but was driven back by the same people who had ousted his brother. He came to serve under Yuan Shang in 202 and was defeated by Cao Cao's officer Zhong Yao, after which he surrendered. Huchuquan was kept as an honored prisoner at Ye and attended Cao Pi's accession ceremony in 220. No new chanyu was proclaimed after Huchuquan's death.

The last vestiges of the Xiongnu were split into five divisions and settled in Taiyuan Commandery under the supervision of Yufuluo's sons, Liu Bao and Qubei.

The Xiongnu went on to found three of the short lived Sixteen Kingdoms: Former Zhao (304–329), Northern Liang (397–439), and Xia (407–431). Later Zhao (319–351) was also founded by one of the 19 Southern Xiongnu tribes, but was of Yuezhi descent.

See also
 Lists of people of the Three Kingdoms

Footnotes

References

 

 

Taskin B.S., "Materials on Sünnu history", Science, Moscow, 1968, p. 31 (In Russian)

Chanyus
People during the end of the Han dynasty
Cao Wei politicians
Han dynasty politicians
2nd-century monarchs in Asia
3rd-century monarchs in Asia